WismART --- NRW Records is a German record label started in Essen in 1992 by producer Jürgen Czisch; the label was moved to Wismar in 2004.  NRW has released albums by jazz, world music, electronic, indie-rock, pop, contemporary artists and groups such as Meike Goosmann, Christina Fuchs, Rosani Reis, Erdmöbel, Lecker Sachen, the WDR Big Band, Cologne and the NDR Big Band (Hamburg). Since its inception the label has released on average 5 albums a year.

History
Dortmund native Jürgen Czisch graduated from the State University of Music Westphalia-Lippe in the 1980s with a degree in piano performance. In 1992 he and classmate Andreas Seemer-Koeper started NRW Records in Essen, Germany.  The label is named for the location of artists and groups the two producers felt were under-represented: 'North Rhine-Westphalia' Records.  The company name of 'MV-NRW Musikverlag' stands for the exchange of composers between East and West German federal states.

Czisch moved NRW Records production location from Zeche Zollverein in Essen to Wismar in 2004 and incorporated the WismART name (WismART Verlag e.K.).  The NRW recording studio has remained at the Essen location.  The new production location in Mecklenburg-Western Pomerania was utilized to coordinate concerts with partners and artists organized by the Festspiele Mecklenburg-Vorpommern and the Schönberger Musiksommer.  In addition to CD projects and production, NRW is involved with the film music genre. One of the highlights for NRW in the film music field is contributions to the soundtrack for the 2011 Academy Award nominated movie Pina by Wim Wenders.  Under the WismART label umbrella, Czisch has developed several successful sub-labels: Clean Feed Records, NRW Records, Cinaire, A-Jazz, Bigband Records plus a big part of the ECM Records back catalogue.

Early on Czisch experimented with music of René Aubry and was able to attract and have success with controversial artists such as Ukrainian singer, songwriter Mariana Sadovska. Also on his roster have been jazz pianists Martin Ehlers and Oliver Maas. WismART/NRW also handles product distribution for the British, avant-garde jazz label Leo Records and Pirouet Records based in Munich. Czisch has also been handling part of the back catalog of ECM Records.  The label is regularly involved with local and international music festivals and trade shows: Jazzahead (Bremen), Classical Next (Rotterdam) and Midem (Cannes).  NRW artist Heiner Schmitz awarded the 2019 WDR Jazz Prize for Composition: compositions recorded on NRW jazz releases from 2012 and 2017.

Recordings (partial list)

WismART/NRW Recordings (partial list)

See also
 List of record labels
 NWR Records (Netherlands)

References

External links

Jazz record labels
German record labels